The Faculty of Political Sciences at Sakarya University (also known as SAU SBF) is one of the sixteen faculties that comprise Sakarya University. Originally established as Faculty of Economics and Administrative Sciences in 1992, it was named as the Faculty of Political Sciences by decree no. 28988 on 2 May 2014.
The faculty spans a range of "discipline areas" and includes Political Science and Public Administration, International Relations, Economics, Labor Economics and Industrial Relations, Public Finance, and Financial Econometrics. The SAU SBF has more than 80 full-time faculty and more than 40 research assistants.

Early history
The Faculty of Political Sciences at Sakarya University was originally established as Faculty of Economic and Administrative Sciences by decree no. 3837 on 11 July 1992.

During 1993-1996, Sabahattin Zaim (1926-2007) served as the first and founding dean of the faculty. As an active member of religious-conservative Society to Disseminate Science (Ilim Yayma Cemiyeti), Zaim put his stamp on the faculty. Some academics served in the faculty during Zaim's period would become the leading figures of conservative/Islamic parties in Turkey. Although it is believed that Zaim invited Abdullah Gül, the 11th President of Turkey, to the faculty, official documents of Sakarya University proves it wrong. Gül actually served in Sakarya University between 1977 and 1983, long before the establishment of the faculty. Although Gül was assistant of Sabahattin Zaim, it seems that he has never been in the Faculty of Economic and Administrative Sciences. On the other hand, Zaim's another assistant Sami Güçlü took an active role in the development of the faculty. Güçlü would be the Minister of Agriculture and Rural Affairs in religious-conservative Justice and Development Party government. However, Zaim's influence on the faculty ended after 1997 Turkish military memorandum in Turkey and many professors, who were close to Zaim, left from the faculty.

The current building of the faculty was constructed in 1998 but it was devastatingly affected by the 1999 İzmit earthquake. One of its staff, Seydi Önder, lost his life during earthquake. Although the faculty moved to prefabs for a while, consecutive earthquakes interrupted education. During the winter semester of 1999-2000 academic year, the faculty suspended its education. The faculty restarted its regular education on 28 February 2000.

Departments 
When Faculty of Economic and Administrative Sciences inaugurated its education in 1992, it was hosting two departments, Economics, and Management. The department of Labor Economics and Industrial Relations, the department of Public Administration (later Political Science and Public Administration), and the department of International Relations were established between 1994 and 1996. While the department of Public Finance was established in 2002, the department of Financial Econometrics inaugurated its education in 2008. In November 2010, three departments, Management, Tourism Management, and Human Resources Management left from the faculty and they were transferred to the newly established Faculty of Management. Under the SAU SBF, the existing departments are as the followings:

 Political Science and Public Administration
 International Relations
 Economics
 Labor Economics and Industrial Relations
 Public Finance
 Financial Econometrics
 Islamic Economics and Finance

Research Centers
The SAU SBF hosted a variety of research centers but some of them were either closed or restructured as institutes. For example, the Center for Middle Eastern Studies was established by the faculty's professors but later it was restructured as an institute under the name Sakarya University Middle East Institute. The SAU SBF currently hosts three research centers.

 Center for European Union Research and Documentation,, provides independent, and balanced analysis to help policymakers and researchers navigate the complex politics and economy of the European Union.
 Sakarya Economic and Social Research Center,
 Research and Practice Center for Diaspora Studies,

Former Deans
Sabahattin Zaim, 1992-1996

Bilal Eryılmaz, 1996-1999

İsmail Dalay, 2000-2003

Engin Yıldırım, 2003-2010

Salih Şimşek, 2010-2014

Kemal Inat, 2014-2014

Noteworthy Former Faculty
İbrahim Erol Kozak, a professor of law

Engin Yıldırım,  the Vice-President of Constitutional Court of Turkey

Ömer İnan, vice-rector of Istanbul Sabahattin Zaim University

Ömer Anayurt, the Chairperson of the Higher Education Supervisory Board in Turkey

Sami Güçlü, former Minister of Agriculture and Rural Affairs

Davut Dursun, former executive of Radio and Television Supreme Council

Burhanettin Duran, the general director of the Foundation for Political, Economic and Social Research

Bilal Eryilmaz, former chair of Council of Ethics for Public Officials in Turkey

Notable alumni

References

Sakarya University
Educational institutions established in 1992
Political science in Turkey
Political science education
1992 establishments in Turkey